Montrepose Cemetery is a burial ground in Kingston, New York, United States.

It is also host to the Agudas Achim Congregation Cemetery.

Burials
 Maryanne Amacher (1938–2009), composer
 Thomas Cornell (1814–1890), politician and businessman
 Mary Sigsbee Fischer (1876–1960) and Anton Otto Fischer (1882–1962), artists
 Arthur Sherwood Flemming (1905–1996), US Secretary of Health, Education, and Welfare
 Walter B. Gibson (1897–1985), author and magician
 James Girard Lindsley (1819–1898), US Congressman
 Jervis McEntee (1828–1891), painter
 Francis Luis Mora (1874–1940), artist
 Calvert Vaux (1824–1895), architect
 Jeneverah M. Winton (1837–1904), American author, poet

References

Further reading

External links
 
 

Kingston, New York
Cemeteries in Ulster County, New York